Peder Nielsen Hemb (23 February 1782, Lardal – 1 September 1850, Lardal) was a Norwegian politician.

He was elected to the Norwegian Parliament in 1836, 1842 and 1845, representing the rural constituency of Jarlsberg og Laurvigs  Amt (today named Vestfold). He worked as a farmer.

References

1782 births
1850 deaths
Members of the Storting
Vestfold politicians